François Bloemhof is a South African author, playwright, composer, copywriter and film reviewer. He writes mostly in Afrikaans and has won a number of prizes for his work.

Biography
Bloemhof was born in the town of Paarl in the Cape Province, South Africa. In 1991 he won the De Kat Prize for Die Nag Het Net Een Oog, a Gothic novel set in a small rural community.

Bloemhof's adult work contains thriller, supernatural and more conventional dramatic elements. He has also written a secret agent (Rooi Luiperd) series as well as one starring a female detective, Alma van der Pool, the screenplay Double Echo, stage plays and radio dramas and serials. He also writes for teenagers.

A series for young readers, Rillers (translated in English as Chillers), comprises eight titles and were winners in the annual ATKV-Veertjie Competition, in which readers of the relevant age evaluate the books.

Bloemhof has published over 100 books for different age groups.

Selected bibliography

Adult Fiction
Die Nag Het Net Een Oog (1991)
Die Duiwel se Tuin (1993)
Koue Soen (1994)
Bloedbroer (1995)
Storieboek (1996)
Mooidraai Basuin (1997)
Nagbesoeker (1997)
Hostis (1998)
Klipgooi (1999)
’n Tweede Asem vir Jan A (2001)
Spinnerak (Alma van der Pool #1) (2006)
Jagseisoen (Alma van der Pool #2) (2007)
Rooi Luiperd (Mark Steyn #1) (2008)
Harde Woorde (Alma van der Pool #3) (2009)
Afspraak in Venesië (Mark Steyn #2) (2009)
Die Onbekendes (2010)
Die Genesis-faktor (Mark Steyn #3) (2010)
Helse Manier van Koebaai Sê (Mark Steyn #4) (2011)
Jy-weet-wie (2012)
Moord in die Beloofde Land (2013)
Pad Na Jou Hart (2013)
Die Vierde Stem (2014)
Vir Altyd (2014)
Vir die Voëls (2016)
Double Echo (Doodskoot) (2016)
Feeding Time (Dieretuin) (2017)
Vergeet My Nie (2020)

Fiction For Teenagers And Younger Readers
Sakkie en die Toffiewolf (1994)
Die Dom Towenaar (1994)
Dinnie Kaboef (1997)
Middernagland (1996)
Die Vrou met die Pers Oog* (1996)
Donderwoud* (1996)
Die Waterding* (1997)
Slinger-slinger (1997)
K-TV Holiday Fun (fun and activity book) (1997)
Kamer 13* (1998)
Die Wit Huis (1998)
Die Speletjie* (1999)
Kry vir jou, Ou Langklou* (2000)
Die Dae Toe Ek Elvis Was (2002)
Hospitaaltyd* (2002)
Agent Snoet en die Botterdiamant (2002)
A Day to Celebrate (’n Dag om te Vier!) (2003)
Who Wants to be What? (Wie Wil Wat Wees?) (2003)
Spiders in the House (Spinnekoppe in die Huis) (2003)
Great Ideas (Blink Gedagtes) (with Johan van Lill) (2003)
Vampiere in Londen* (2004)
Nie Vir Kinders Nie (2005)
Agent Snoet en die Kattekwaad (2005)
City at the End of the World (Stad aan die Einde van die Wêreld) (2007)
Moenie dat die Grootmense Hoor Nie (2009)
Agent Snoet en die Hondelewe (2008)
Flipom (2009)
Agent Snoet en die Groen Genugtig (2010)
13 Spookstories (2010)
Die Land Verby Donker (2012)
Vreeslike Versies (Afrikaans translation of Roald Dahl's Revolting Rhymes) (2012)
Nog 13 Spookstories (2012)
Koue Rillings (2013)
Liefde, Moord en Facebook (2015)
Agent Snoet en die Windlawaai (2016)
Agent Snoet 5-in-1 Omnibus (2019)
    * in the Rillers/Chillers series (only Afrikaans titles are given)

External links
 francoisbloemhof.net The official François Bloemhof website (in Afrikaans)
 NB Publishers biography 
 LAPA biography (in Afrikaans)
 Stellenbosch Writers biography
 Storiewerf biography (in Afrikaans)
 a bibliography by Vetseun

Living people
People from Paarl
Afrikaner people
South African people of Dutch descent
Afrikaans-language writers
South African writers
1962 births